also known as Cat Mario, is a Japanese freeware platform game released in February 2007. It is known for its levels designed to cause extreme frustration due to innocuous-looking objects that suddenly kill the character. Though the game is a parody of Super Mario Bros. for the Nintendo Entertainment System, it adds elements from other Mario games such as Super Mario World.

Gameplay
The player controls a kitten-like character (with an appearance similar to Toro Inoue) who must venture through side-scrolling platform levels similar to Super Mario Bros. The game consists of four levels (six in the online version, eighteen on Android and iOS versions) riddled with traps designed to trick the player, and abuse their previous knowledge of Super Mario Bros. gameplay, including normal-looking ground tiles that fall away into pits, blocks that sprout spikes when touched, a coin block at the start of a level that goes up when the players try to hit it, enemies that spawn nearly on top of the character, deadly background scenery, coin blocks rigged at the edge of a pit to cause the character to fall down, warp pipes flying, and a Mario-style flagpole that kills the character in two different ways, either by falling over or shooting a laser towards the player character. Despite the surprise factor of these traps, the levels do not change between plays, allowing the player to memorize their locations and patterns and eventually make progress. Some designers have commented on how the game requires the player to think logically through trial-and-error in order to complete the game at defeating the main antagonist called Onion King. The player has infinite lives.

Development
Syobon Action was released as freeware for Windows in February 2007. The game was designed by independent Japanese game developer "Chiku", and was inspired by The Big Adventure of Owata, a similar game released through the Japanese 2channel message board a year prior. Chiku chose to make his game a spoof of Super Mario Bros. due to its massive recognition and popularity. The first stage was completed in three days and presented at a cultural festival hosted at his college campus, becoming the most popular work presented. A video showcasing the demo was uploaded to his Niconico account a few days later and garnered over 1000 views shortly after, which prompted Chiku to make the demo a full game. Three new stages were produced within the span of two weeks. The music of the game consists mainly of covers of songs created for other video games such as Action 52, Spelunker, Ghosts 'n Goblins and Puyo Puyo.

Reception
Syobon Action was generally received positively, though the reviews note the intense and often frustrating difficulty of the game. It was recognized as a game that "systematically disrupts every convention of 2D platform gameplay", and that success in the game often relies on both trial-and-error-like strategies and the player's ability to use counterintuitive strategies to avoid obstacles. Open Syobon Action was downloaded alone via SourceForge.net over 150,000 times between 2010 and 2020.

See also
 Trap Adventure 2
 I Wanna Be The Guy

Notes

References

2007 video games
Unofficial works based on Mario
Free online games
Parody video games
Video games about cats
Video games developed in Japan
Freeware games
Fictional cats
Fangames